John McLoughlin, also known as Dr. John McLoughlin, is a bronze sculpture of John McLoughlin by Alexander Phimister Proctor and completed by his son Gifford MacGregor Proctor. One statue is installed at the Oregon State Capitol grounds in Salem, Oregon; another is installed in Washington, D.C., as part of the National Statuary Hall Collection.

Description and history
McLoughlin is shown wearing a suit and cape, with a top hat in his left hand. He has long hair and large sideburns. His left foot is in front of his right, and his right hand extends forward and is clenched in a fist. The statue in Oregon measures approximately  x  x  and rests on a concrete base that measures  x  x . Its south side includes an inscription that reads: . A plaque on the front of the base displays the founder's mark and the text: .

The Oregon bronze, installed on the grounds of the Oregon State Capitol in Salem, was created during 1950–1953 and dedicated in 1953. According to the Smithsonian Institution, it is a duplicate of another bronze unveiled in the United States Capitol in 1952, as part of the National Statuary Hall Collection. This sculpture was financed mainly by legislative appropriation, but also from contributions by Oregon school children. Its model was completed before Proctor's death in 1950. His son and associate Gifford MacGregor Proctor completed the sculpture. The statue was surveyed and considered "treatment needed" by the Smithsonian's "Save Outdoor Sculpture!" program in April 1993, and was administered by the Facility Services department of the State of Oregon at that time.

The statue is one of two that Proctor has had placed in the National Statuary Hall Collection.

See also
 1953 in art
 John McLoughlin Bridge

References

External links
 

1953 establishments in Oregon
1953 sculptures
Bronze sculptures in Oregon
Bronze sculptures in Washington, D.C.
Monuments and memorials in Salem, Oregon
Monuments and memorials in Washington, D.C.
McLoughlin
Outdoor sculptures in Salem, Oregon
Sculptures by Alexander Phimister Proctor
Sculptures of men in Oregon
Sculptures of men in Washington, D.C.
Statues by Alexander Phimister Proctor in Oregon